Goruia is a commune in Caraș-Severin County, western Romania with a population of 951 people. It is composed of three villages: Gârliște (Gerlistye), Giurgiova (Karasszentgyörgy) and Goruia.

Natives
 Damaschin Bojincă

References

Communes in Caraș-Severin County
Localities in Romanian Banat